Leidi is a 2014 Colombian short drama film directed by Simón Mesa Soto. It won the Short Film Palme d'Or at the 2014 Cannes Film Festival.

Synopsis
Leidi lives with her mom and her baby. Her boyfriend, Alexis, hasn't shown up in days. That sunny morning, after she's bathed her baby, Leidi is sent to buy plantains. Outside, a guy tells her he has seen Alexis with another girl. Leidi won't return home until she finds the father of her child.

Cast
 Alejandra Montoya Villa as Leidi
 Héctor Alfredo Orrego as Alexis

See also
 Short Film Palme d'Or

References

External links
 

2014 films
2010s Spanish-language films
2014 drama films
2014 short films
Short Film Palme d'Or winners
Colombian short films
Colombian drama films
2010s Colombian films